Omija-cha or magnolia berry tea is a traditional Korean tea made from dried magnolia berries—omija in Korean. Omija means "five flavors", which are sweetness, sourness, bitterness, saltiness, and pungency. The tea can be made by boiling dried magnolia berries in water on low heat, then adding honey. Alternatively, ground magnolia berry seeds can be added to cold water to make the tea.

Omija-cha, served either hot or cold, is also used to make omija-hwachae (magnolia berry punch).

See also 
 Traditional Korean tea

References 

Korean drinks
Korean tea
Herbal tea